The 2000–01 Boston College Eagles men's basketball team represented Boston College as a member of the Big East Conference during the 2000–01 NCAA Division I men's basketball season. Led by head coach Al Skinner, they played their home games at Conte Forum in Chestnut Hill, Massachusetts. The team finished atop the Big East regular season standings, won the Big East tournament, and received an automatic bid to the NCAA tournament. Playing as the No. 3 seed in the East region, the Eagles defeated  in the opening round before being upset 74–71 by No. 6 seed USC in the second round. Boston College finished the season with a 27–5 (13–3 Big East) record and a No. 7 ranking in the AP poll.

Roster

Schedule and results 

|-
!colspan=9 style=| Regular season

|-
!colspan=9 style=| Big East tournament

|-
!colspan=9 style=| NCAA Tournament

Rankings

References

Boston College Eagles men's basketball seasons
Boston College
Boston College
Boston College Eagles men's basketball
Boston College Eagles men's basketball
Boston College Eagles men's basketball
Boston College Eagles men's basketball